In The Wings (1986–2004) was a Thoroughbred racehorse who raced from a base in France. He was bred and raced by Sheikh Mohammed, and trained in France by André Fabre,

Racing career
On June 17, 1988 at Chantilly Racecourse, In The Wings made a winning debut in the 1988 Prix de Vineuil under jockey Cash Asmussen. Rider and horse next won August's Prix du Haras de la Huderie at Deauville-La Touques Racecourse. The colt did not race again until September 1989 but the then three-year-old picked up where he left off, winning the Prix du Prince d'Orange at Longchamp Racecourse in Paris. In his next start, In The Wings suffered his first defeat, finishing eleventh in the Prix de l'Arc de Triomphe against some of the best older horses in Europe.

In The Wings returned to race in France as a four-year-old in 1990. On April 29, he finished second in the Prix Ganay at Longchamp before winning June's Group One Coronation Cup at England's Epsom Downs Racecourse. He then returned to France where he won the G1 Grand Prix de Saint-Cloud. After finishing fifth in the King George VI and Queen Elizabeth Stakes at Ascot Racecourse, In The Wings won the September Prix Foy at Longchamp. In his second Prix de l'Arc de Triomphe, he finished fourth but then won the richest race of his career at Belmont Park in Elmont, New York on October 27, 1990. Ridden by future U.S. Racing Hall of Fame jockey Gary Stevens, In The Wings won the US$2 million Breeders' Cup Turf, defeating such notable runners as With Approval (2nd), Saumarez, (5th), Pleasant Tap (8th), and Sky Classic (11th).

Stud record
Following his win in the Breeders' Cup, In The Wings was retired to stud duty. A successful sire, among his notable offspring were:
 Singspiel (b. 1992) - International superstar runner who won the Canadian International Stakes (1996), Japan Cup (1996), Dubai World Cup (1997), Coronation Cup (1997), International Stakes (1997)
 Winged Love (b. 1992) - won Irish Derby Stakes
 Central Park (b. 1995) - won Derby Italiano (1998), Premio Presidente della Repubblica (1999)
 Mamool (b. 1999) - won 2003 Grosser Bugatti Preis & Preis von Europa (career earnings of £742,317
 Inglis Drever (b. 1999) - won Long Distance Hurdle (2005, 2006, 2007), World Hurdle (2005, 2007, 2008), named 2007 ROA/Racing Post Outstanding Hurdler, 2007-2008 Anglo-Irish Jumps Champion
 Soldier Hollow (b. 2000) - 2004 German Horse of the Year, career earnings of £836,728

Suffering from laminitis, at age eighteen In The Wings was humanely euthanized on 3 April 2004.

Pedigree

References
 In The Wings's pedigree and partial racing stats

1986 racehorse births
2004 racehorse deaths
Racehorses bred in the United Kingdom
Racehorses trained in France
Breeders' Cup Turf winners
Thoroughbred family 9-e
Chefs-de-Race